Third Screen Media is a mobile advertising company based in the United States. It was acquired by AOL on May 14, 2007.

References

AOL